In enzymology, an alkylglycerol kinase is an enzyme that catalyzes the chemical reaction

ATP + 1-O-alkyl-sn-glycerol  ADP + 1-O-alkyl-sn-glycerol 3-phosphate

Thus, the two substrates of this enzyme are ATP and 1-O-alkyl-sn-glycerol, whereas its two products are ADP and 1-O-alkyl-sn-glycerol 3-phosphate.

This enzyme belongs to the family of transferases, specifically those transferring phosphorus-containing groups (phosphotransferases) with an alcohol group as acceptor.  The systematic name of this enzyme class is ATP:1-O-alkyl-sn-glycerol 3-phosphotransferase. Other names in common use include 1-alkylglycerol kinase (phosphorylating), ATP-alkylglycerol phosphotransferase, alkylglycerol phosphotransferase, and ATP: 1-alkyl-sn-glycerol phosphotransferase.  This enzyme participates in ether lipid metabolism.

References

 

EC 2.7.1
Enzymes of unknown structure